is a Japanese manga series written and illustrated by Forbidden Shibukawa. It has been serialized in Shueisha's seinen manga magazine Weekly Young Jump since July 2017.

Publication
Written and illustrated by Forbidden Shibukawa, Snack Basue started in Shueisha's seinen manga magazine Weekly Young Jump on July 13, 2017. Shueisha has collected its chapters into individual tankōbon volumes. The first volume was released on February 19, 2018. As of November 17, 2022, twelve volumes have been released.

Volume list

References

External links
 

Cooking in anime and manga
Parody anime and manga
Seinen manga
Shueisha manga